Charles H. Ballam (May 10, 1901 – December 12, 1981) was a Canadian union leader, officeholder and delegate at Newfoundland National Convention.

Ballam was born in 1901 in Curling, Newfoundland Colony, son of Alice and Manoah Ballam.  He was educated at Curling high school, became an apprentice in the electrical department of the Anglo-Newfoundland Development Company, operators of the pulp and paper mill in Grand Falls. When Bowater's constructed a pulp and paper mill in Corner Brook in the mid-1920s, Ballam moved there to be close to his former home in Curling. In 1940, his career changed when he became a representative for Sun Life Assurance Company.

Ballam, elected president of Local 64 of the Pulp and Sulphite Workers Union in Corner Brook in 1935, had also attended the founding convention of the Newfoundland Federation of Labour in 1937. In 1939, he relinquished his leadership role with Local 64 to become president of the new federation, a position he held until the following year when he left the Corner Brook mill to enter the insurance business.

Ballam decided to offer himself for one of the two delegate positions assigned to Humber district at the National Convention, that was set up by the British government on December 11, 1945 to determine the political fate of Newfoundland and Labrador. He had won the position with 1,624 votes, second to Pierce Fudge, another well-known and popular labour leader.

At the convention, Smallwood felt he could count on Ballam for support for the motion he planned to introduce early in the convention calling for a delegation to Ottawa to discuss potential terms of union between Canada and Newfoundland. Ballam, in his speech to the convention on Smallwood's resolution, clearly states that he is 
not a Confederate and not supporting any particular form of government; but in the interests of the whole country I would like to see something definite done on this question once and for all.
Even though Smallwood failed in his first attempt to have such a delegation appointed, he was successful later in the convention. Ballam voted in favour of both resolutions, and was elected as one of the delegates to go to Ottawa to explore terms in June 1947. The delegation's report, tabled at the Convention in November, was rejected by a majority of its members.

Confederation did eventually make it as one of the ballot options presented to the people of Newfoundland in a referendum held on June 3, 1948. By then, Ballam was a committed Confederate. He was one of the leading campaigners for the Confederate forces in Corner Brook and the surrounding area for that referendum and for a second referendum held on July 22. Ballam was selected by Joseph R. Smallwood, the interim premier, to be a part of his cabinet when it was sworn into office on March 31, 1949. That cabinet held office until the first post-Confederate House of Assembly was elected on May 27, 1949, after which a new cabinet was sworn in from the elected MHAs. Ballam won his seat and once again was given the portfolio the Department of Labour. He held that portfolio for the next 17 years.

Re-elected in the district of Humber in 1951 and, following redistribution, of Humber West in 1956, 1959 and 1962, in 1966 he announced his retirement from politics, following which he was appointed a member of the board of the Newfoundland and Labrador Power Commission. He died on December 12, 1981.

Ballam and his wife E. Maria Bagg established a scholarship in memory of their son Ulric, who was killed in an accident at the Corner Brook pulp and paper mill on July 27, 1945, at the age of 17, to be awarded annually to a term 2 engineering student at Memorial University of Newfoundland.

See also
 List of people of Newfoundland and Labrador
 List of communities in Newfoundland and Labrador

References

External links 
The Ottawa Delegation 1947
Royal Commission on Renewing and Strengthening Our Place in Canada pdf file.

1901 births
1981 deaths
Newfoundland National Convention members
Members of the Executive Council of Newfoundland and Labrador
Liberal Party of Newfoundland and Labrador MHAs